The Sanjak of Salonica or Selanik was a second-level Ottoman province (sanjak or liva) encompassing the environs of the city of Thessalonica (Salonica, Turkish Selanik) and the Chalcidice peninsula.

History 

After its final conquest from the Republic of Venice, Thessalonica became a sanjak centre within the Rumeli Eyalet, encompassing central Macedonia between the Vardar and Aliakmon rivers, as well as the Chalcidice peninsula.

By 1846, as part of the Tanzimat reforms, Thessalonica became the centre of a separate eyalet (Salonica Eyalet, after 1867 Salonica Vilayet), and hence the sanjak became the new province's pasha-sanjak.

In 1912, the sanjak comprised the following districts (kazas): Selanik proper, Kesendire (Kassandra Peninsula), Karaferye (Veroia), Yenice Vardar (Giannitsa), Vodina (Edessa), Langaza (Langadas), Gevgelü (Gevgelija), Avret Hişar (Neo Gynaikokastro), Toyran (Star Dojran), Ustrumca (Strumica), Tikoş/Kavadar (Kavadarci), Katerin (Katerini), Aynaroz (Mount Athos) and Karaağaabad. Most of the sanjak was captured by Greece in October 1912, during the First Balkan War, while the northern portions fell to Serbia and are now part of North Macedonia.

References 

Sanjaks of the Ottoman Empire in Europe
Macedonia under the Ottoman Empire
States and territories established in 1430
States and territories disestablished in 1912
Sanjak of Salonica
Sanjak of Salonica
1430 establishments in the Ottoman Empire
1912 disestablishments in the Ottoman Empire